The PracTeX Journal, or simply PracTeX, also known as TPJ, was an online journal focussing on practical use of the TeX typesetting system. The first issue appeared in March 2005. It was published by the TeX Users Group and intended to be a complement to their primary print journal, TUGboat. The PracTeX Journal was last published in October 2012.

Topics covered in PracTeX included:
 publishing projects or activities accomplished through the use of TeX
 problems that were resolved through the use of TeX or problems with TeX that were resolved
 how to use certain LaTeX packages
 questions & answers
 introductions for beginners

The editorial board included many long-time and well-known TeX developers, including Lance Carnes, Arthur Ogawa, and Hans Hagen.

References

External links
Journal home page

Online magazines published in the United States
Defunct computer magazines published in the United States
Magazines established in 2005
Magazines disestablished in 2012
TeX
Typesetting